Klaus König (born 26 May 1934 in Beuthen, Upper Silesia) is a German operatic tenor.

References 
Karl J. Kutsch and Leo Riemens: Großes Sängerlexikon. Dritte, erweiterte Auflage. München 1999. Band 43: Hirata–Möwes, S. 1859/1860. 

 Rollenverzeichnis von Klaus König in: Chronik der Wiener Staatsoper 1945–1995, Verlag Anton Schroll & Co., Wien und München 1995, S. 458. 
 Guntram Archiv 1988, Homepage des Opernsängers Kenneth Garrison
Leonard Bernsteins symbolischer Beethoven Rezension anlässlich der CD-Veröffentlichung, KlassikAkzente vom 27. Mai 2009
Rückblende 27. Schlesisches Musikfest 14. – 16. Juni 1996 in Görlitz
Rückblende 28. Schlesisches Musikfest 10. – 14. Juni 1998 in Görlitz
Theater: Benefizgala (PDF; 3,5 MB) in: Blicklicht, Ausgabe 15, Dezember 2002, S. 27

External links

 

 

1934 births
German operatic tenors
Living people
People from Bytom
People from the Province of Silesia
20th-century German  male opera singers
Hochschule für Musik Carl Maria von Weber alumni